Events in the year 1581 in Norway.

Incumbents
Monarch: Frederick II

Events

Arts and literature

Births

Deaths 
Mogens Svale, military commander and landowner (born c.1530).

See also

References